Litsea monopetala is a plant in the family Lauraceae, native to China and tropical Asia. In Nepal, it is found in the regions from the Terai to 1450 m, in Shorea robusta forest and tropical evergreen forest. In India it is found in Assam, Odisha, Eastern Himalayas, Maharashtra (Pune, Sindhudurg) and Tamil Nadu (Coimbatore).

It grows up to a height of 18 meters with a diameter of 60 cm. The density of the wood at 15% moisture is 540 kg/cbm.

References

monopetala
Flora of China
Flora of tropical Asia